Elger is a lunar impact crater that lies along the southern edge of Palus Epidemiarum, the Marsh of Epidemics, in the southwest part of the Moon's near side. To the northeast is the flooded crater Capuanus, and farther to the northwest is Ramsden.

The crater is named after British astronomer Thomas Gwyn Elger.

The rim of this formation is rough and somewhat eroded formation, with a break and an outward bulge along the northern end, while a ridge intrudes into the southern rim. The interior has been resurfaced by lava, although the albedo of the floor is not quite as low as the lunar mare surface to the north.

Satellite craters

By convention these features are identified on lunar maps by placing the letter on the side of the crater midpoint that is closest to Elger.

References

 
 
 
 
 
 
 
 
 
 
 

Impact craters on the Moon